Mark Lancaster may refer to:

 Mark Lancaster, Baron Lancaster of Kimbolton (born 1970), British Conservative politician
 Mark Lancaster (artist) (1938–2021), British artist and set designer